The Hun Sen Cup is the main football knockout tournament in Cambodia. The 2007 Hun Sen Cup was the 1st season of the Hun Sen Cup, the premier knockout tournament for association football clubs in Cambodia involving Cambodian League and provincial teams organized by the Football Federation of Cambodia.

Group stage
There were 28 participants from Cambodian League and other provinces.

Round of 16

Quarter-finals

Semi-finals

Third place play-off

Final

Awards
 Top Goal Scorers: Hok Sochivorn of Phnom Penh Crown
 Fair Play: Build Bright University

References

Hun Sen Cup seasons
2007 in Cambodian football